Alti Aghaj or Alti Aqaj may refer to:

 Alti Aghaj-e Bozorg, a village in Iran
 Alti Aghaj-e Kuchak, a village in Iran